Several ships of the Chilean Navy have been named Almirante Lynch after Patricio Lynch (1824–1886), a Chilean hero during the War of the Pacific

 , lead ship of her class of destroyers, launched in 1912, and decommissioned in 1945
 , a Type 23 frigate, the former HMS Grafton (F80), commissioned into the Chilean Navy in 2007

Chilean Navy ship names